Pope Timothy I of Alexandria, 22nd Pope of Alexandria & Patriarch of the See of St. Mark, died about July 20, 384.

He presided over the second Ecumenical Council at Constantinople called by Emperor Theodosius.

References

Sources

Saints from Roman Egypt
4th-century Popes and Patriarchs of Alexandria
4th-century Christian saints
384 deaths